Kesari is a male vanara, and a character in Hindu mythology. He is the father of Hanuman and the husband of Anjana.

Legend 
While Kesari resided in Mount Meru, Brahmā cursed an apsara named Managarva, and turned her into a vanara. She married Kesari, under the name Anjana. For a long time, the couple were childless. Anjana propitiated Vayu for a child.

In Shaiva tradition, Shiva was requested to beget a son to help Vishnu, who was about to incarnate as Rama to slay Ravana. Shiva and Parvati took the form of vanaras and engaged in intercourse. When Vayu appeared, the couple made their presence know, and Parvati revealed the child inside her. Parvati refused to take the foetus in the form of a vanara to Kailasha. As Shiva had instructed, Parvati offered the child to Vayu, who transferred it to Anjana's womb, who gave birth to Hanuman.

In popular culture

References

External links
 Birth of Hanuman Story

Vanara in the Ramayana
Characters in the Ramayana